Neshaminy Creek is a  stream that runs entirely through Bucks County, Pennsylvania, rising south of the borough of Chalfont, where its north and west branches join. Neshaminy Creek flows southeast toward Bristol Township and Bensalem Township to its confluence with the Delaware River. The name "Neshaminy" originates with the Lenni Lenape and is thought to mean "place where we drink twice".  This phenomenon refers to a section of the creek known as the Neshaminy Palisades, where the course of the water slows and changes direction at almost a right angle, nearly forcing the water back upon itself. These palisades are located in  Dark Hollow Park, operated by the county, and are flanked by Warwick Township to the south and Buckingham Township to the north.

Statistics

It is part of the greater Delaware River watershed. The creek's course runs mostly through suburban areas to the north of Philadelphia. However, the course of the creek does run through a few sections of rural and semi-rural terrain, and some forested areas remain. Neshaminy Creek passes through two state parks, Tyler State Park and Neshaminy State Park. Neshaminy Creek has the distinction of having three tributaries named Mill Creek.

History
The name seems to derive from the Lenape 'Nesha-men-ning', loosely meaning 'the place where we drink twice' or 'two drinking places'. Older names were written as Nishambanach (1671), Nichmink, Nishammis (1679), Nishmines (1680), Neshimineh (1682), Neshamineh (1686), Neshaminia (1688), Neshamenah (1702), and others. This may refer to two springs near a village of the Lenape, since native people drink from a spring whenever available rather than from a stream. The location of the springs is unknown, but may have been two springs extant many years ago, not far from the confluence of the north and west branches. The Neshaminy was the first stream in Bucks County to have been crossed by ferries and bridges. The Gordon Gazetteer of 1832 called it the Neshaminy River and stated that "over it, there are many fine wooden and stone bridges. The bridge nearest its mouth on the road to New York is a draw bridge-in private property, erected by the Messrs. Bassonet and Johnson, whose heirs and assigns levy tolls by virtue of the Act of Assembly 6th Sept. 1785. The Neshaminy as far as Barnsleys Ford was declared a public highway by Act of 9th March, 1771."
The stream has seen a number of major floods. In the Mina flood of 1833, most of the bridges were washed away and was the highest flood known at that time. As the waters reached the Delaware River, the flow was so great as to reach the New Jersey shoreline leaving a large pile of debris and preventing shipping from traversing the river. The Neshaminy has been the subject of many artists over the years.

Geology
Appalachian Division, Piedmont Province, Gettysburg-Newark Section
Beginning at the junction of the West Branch and North Branch Neshaminy Creeks, Neshaminy Creek begins in the Brunswick Formation, formed during the Jurassic and Triassic, which consists of mainly mudstone, shale, and siltstone. Mineralogy includes argillite and hornfels. West of Chalfont it passes into an extension of the Lockatong Formation for a short distance, back into the Brunswick, then again to the Lockatong. The Lockatong Formation was deposited during the Triassic and consists of argillite, shale, and occasionally, a layer of limestone.

East of Chalfont, the Neshaminy flows into the Stockton Formation, laid during the Triassic, consisting of arkosic sandstone, sandstone, shale, siltstone, and mudstone. It flows generally along the Stockton and Lockatong transition until the Neshaminy palisades, where it turns west, then in a few miles turns south into a region of felsic gneiss, which contains quartz, microcline, pyroxene, and biotite.

Appalachian Division, Piedmont Province, Upland Section
After passing Oakford, it passes through a small deposit of mafic gneiss, from the Precambrian, which contains calcic plagioclase, hypersthene or augite, quartz, and hornblende.

Appalachian Division, Piedmont Province, Lowland and Intermediate Upland Section
Next, the stream passes into the Wissahickon Formation (lower Paleozoic), a schist which has metamorphosed into a facies, containing garnet, staurolite, kyanite, and sillimanite. The Wissahickon also contains oligoclase-mica schist, hornblende and augen gneiss', and some feldspar.

It, then, passes through a region of Pensauken and Bridgeton Formations, from the Tertiary, but it has eroded through it to the underlying Wissahickon Formation. Both formations consist of quartz sand.

Finally, the Neshaminy passes through the Trenton gravel formation, from the Quaternary, which is sand and clay-silt where it meets the Delaware River.

Named tributaries

Mill Creek
Pine Run
Ironworks Creek
Newtown Creek
Mill Creek
Robin Run
Watson Creek
Lahaska Creek
Little Neshaminy Creek
Park Creek
Cooks Run
Mill Creek
North Branch Neshaminy Creek
Pine Run
West Branch Neshaminy Creek
Reading Creek

Adjacent municipalities
Bensalem Township
Bristol Township
Buckingham Township
Chalfont
Doylestown
Doylestown Township
Hatfield
Hulmeville
Ivyland
Langhorne
Langhorne Manor
Lansdale
Lower Southampton Township
Middletown Township
New Britain
New Britain Township
Newtown
Newtown Township
Northampton Township
Penndel
Plumstead Township
Upper Southampton Township
Warminster Township
Warwick Township
Wrightstown Township

Flooding
Like other rivers and streams, the Neshaminy Creek poses a flooding threat to neighboring areas in times of rapid downpours. In 2005, the Natural Resources Conservation Service earmarked $3 million for flood mitigation programs along the Neshaminy Creek. The creek was the site of significant flooding again from June 25 through July 5, 2006 during the Mid-Atlantic United States flood of 2006. In late August through early September 2011, Hurricane Irene, and Tropical Storm Lee (2011) rose the Neshaminy Creek to levels which had not seen before in 100 years. Repairs cost around $1 million total.

Crossings and bridges

See also
List of rivers of Pennsylvania
List of rivers of the United States
List of Delaware River tributaries
Neshaminy Creek Brewing Company

References

Sources and external links

U.S. Geological Survey: PA stream gaging stations
http://www.delawareriverkeeper.org/factsheets/neshaminy.html
http://fitzpatrick.house.gov/News/DocumentPrint.aspx?DocumentID=36389
Map of the Forks of the Neshaminy (showing the nearly right angle in the creek within Dark Hollow Park)
Dark Hollow Park Fact Sheet

Rivers of Pennsylvania
Tributaries of the Delaware River
Rivers of Bucks County, Pennsylvania